was a gunboat of the Tokugawa Navy, and Japan's first domestically-built steam warship (Japan's first steamship was the  built by the fief of Satsuma in 1855). She was a 3rd class wooden gunboat and laid down May 7, 1861, and launched July 2, 1863 by the shipbuilder, and future industrial giant, Ishikawajima.

Completed in May 1866, She participated in the conflict of the Boshin War with the Bakufu loyalists, against the newly formed Imperial Army. She was captured during the Naval Battle of Hakodate Bay, and was grounded during the conflict. In May 1868 she was seized by the Japanese government, then captured by the rebels on 4 October 1868. Recaptured again by the Japanese government on 30 April 1869, she became a training ship until she was decommissioned on 28 January 1888. Afterwards she served as a whaling ship until 1911, after which time she was broken up (scrapped).

Notes

References

Bibliography

Gunboats of the Imperial Japanese Navy
1863 ships
Ships of the Tokugawa Navy